Television and Production Exponents Inc. (TAPE Inc.) is a Philippine television production company established in 1978 and is a partner of GMA Network Inc. (after Radio Philippines Network and ABS-CBN Corporation). It was founded by former ABS-CBN sales executive Romy Jalosjos with Antonio "Tony" Tuviera, Vic Sotto, Tito Sotto and Joey de Leon. It is known as the producer of the longest running noontime variety show (and franchise) Eat Bulaga! since 1979, among several Philippine television dramas. The offices and production studios are located at Xavierville Avenue, Loyola Heights, Quezon City.

Shows produced by TAPE Inc.

Co-productions

Previously produced shows

Eat Bulaga! Lenten Drama Specials
These were traditionally aired during Holy Week.

1990
 Ang Angkan ni David

1991
 Nang si Hudas ay Nadulas 
 Numero Uno' Part 1
 Numero Uno' Part 2

1993
 Tatlong Makasalanan

1994
 Nauntog si Hestas, Nagising si Dimas

1995
 Bakit Naman Ako Pa?

1997
 Mga Ginoong Marya

2001
 Sino Ang Bestfriend Ko?

2003
 The Manager 
 May Isang Bata

2004

 Ama't Anak 
 Alalay 
 Angel

2005

 Perfect 
 True Love 
 Tahanan

2006

 Mama 
 Waiting Room 
 Ganyan Kita Kamahal

2007

 Sa Iyong Paglaya 
 Binhi Sa Matabang Lupa 
 Star

2008
 Ang Mga Anak Ng Maestro

2014

 Karugtong ng Puso 
 Ilaw ng Kahapon 
 Hakbang sa Pangarap 
 Kulungan Kanlungan 
 Anyo ng Pag-Ibig 
 Pangalawang Bukas

2015

 Biro ng Kapalaran 
 Lukso ng Dugo 
 Pangako ng Pag-Ibig 
 Pinagpalang Ama 
 Aruga ng Puso 
 Sukli ng Pagmamahal

2016

 Dalangin ng Ama 
 Kaputol ng Buhay 
 Walang Kapalit 
 Panata 
 God Gave Me You

2017

 Inay 
 Kapatid 
 Pagpapatawad 
 Prinsesa 
 Mansyon 
 Kaibigan

2018

 My Carinderia Girl 
 Haligi ng Pangarap 
 Pamilya 
 A Daughter's Love 
 Hating Kapatid 
 Taray ni Tatay

2019

 Bulawan 
 Biyaheng Broken Hearted 
 Ikigai: Ang Buhay Ng Buhay Ko

2023

 TBA 
 TBA 
 TBA

2024

 TBA 
 TBA 
 TBA

TAPE TV Specials
Eat Bulaga 10th Anniversary Special (1989)
Eat Bulaga 20th Anniversary Special (1999)
Eat Bulaga! Silver Special (2004)
Eat Bulaga 30th Anniversary Special (2009)
A Party for Every Juan: The Jose and Wally Concert (2012)
Jose and Wally Concert: A Party For Juan and All (2013)
AlDub: Sa Tamang Panahon at the Philippine Arena (2015)
 Imagine You and Me: The Journey (2016)
 Miss Millennial Philippines Grand Coronation Day Special at the MOA Arena (2017)
 Aldub First TeleMovie Title is Love is... (2017)
 The Barangay Jokers Special Horror-Comedy Telemovie Pamana (2018)
Eat Bulaga 45th Anniversary Special (2024)

See also
List of programs broadcast by GMA Network
List of programs aired by GMA Network
List of GMA Network drama series

References

TV5 (Philippine TV network)
ABS-CBN
GMA Network
Radio Philippines Network
 
Television in Metro Manila
Television production companies of the Philippines
Mass media companies established in 1978
Companies based in Quezon City
1978 establishments in the Philippines